The Civilization of the Renaissance in Italy is an 1860 work on the Italian Renaissance by Swiss historian Jacob Burckhardt. Together with his History of the Renaissance in Italy (Die Geschichte der Renaissance in Italien; 1867) it is counted among the classics of Renaissance historiography.  An English translation was produced by S.G.C. Middlemore in two volumes, London 1878.

Content 
According to Denys Hay:
Burkhardt sought to capture and define the spirit of the age in all its main manifestations. For him ‘’Kultur’’ was the whole picture: politics, manners, religion...the character that animated the particular activities of a people in a given epoch, and of which pictures, buildings, social and political habits, literature, are the concrete expressions.

Its scholarly judgements are considered to have been largely justified by subsequent research according to historians including Desmond Seward and art historians such as Kenneth Clark.

The Civilization of the Renaissance in Italy is divided into six parts:
 Part One: The State as a Work of Art
 Part Two: The Development of the Individual
 Part Three: The Revival of Antiquity
 Part Four: The Discovery of the World and of Man
 Part Five: Society and Festivals
 Part Six: Morality and Religion

Editions
1878. The Civilization of the Renaissance in Italy.
1990. The Civilization of the Renaissance in Italy. Penguin Classics.

See also

The Autumn of the Middle Ages
A Distant Mirror

References

Further reading

 Baron, Hans. "Burckhardt's 'Civilization of the Renaissance' a Century after its Publication." Renaissance News 13.3 (1960): 207-222 online.

 Ferguson, Wallace K. The Renaissance and Historical Thought (1948), pp. 179–192 online
 Garner, Roberta. "Jacob Burckhardt as a Theorist of Modernity: Reading The Civilization of the Renaissance in Italy." Sociological Theory (1990): 48-57 online also online at JSTOR

 Hay, Denys. "Burckhardt's Renaissance: 1860-1960." History Today (Jan. 1960), volume 10, issue 1, pp. 14-23.

1860 books
Works about the Renaissance
Italian Renaissance
History books about the Renaissance
History books about Italy